Make-Up is a 1937 British drama film directed by Alfred Zeisler and starring Nils Asther, June Clyde and Judy Kelly. It was a circus film made by an independent production company at Shepperton Studios.

Plot
Born in a circus, Bux (Nils Asther) hankers after life there, but is pressurised by his family to study to become a surgeon. However, the lure of the Big Top proves too strong, and he abandons his medical career for a life as a circus clown. His clinical expertise comes in handy when attending the injuries of a young woman knocked down by an elephant, and romance beckons.

Cast
 Nils Asther as Bux  
 June Clyde as Joy  
 Judy Kelly as Marien Hutton 
 Lawrence Grossmith as Sir Edward Hutton  
 Jill Craigie as Tania  
 Kenne Duncan as Lorenzo  
 Lawrence Anderson as Goro
 Roddy Hughes as Mr. Greenswarter 
 Johnnie Schofield as Publicity Man  
 John Turnbull as Karo 
 Norma Varden as Hostess 
 Billy Wells as Ringmaster

References

Bibliography
 Low, Rachael. Filmmaking in 1930s Britain. George Allen & Unwin, 1985.
 Wood, Linda. British Films, 1927-1939. British Film Institute, 1986.

External links

1937 films
British drama films
British black-and-white films
1937 drama films
Circus films
Films directed by Alfred Zeisler
Films shot at Shepperton Studios
British remakes of French films
1930s English-language films
1930s British films